The Vinita Cherokees were a minor league baseball team based in Vinita, Oklahoma. In 1905 and 1906, Vinita teams played as members of the Missouri Valley League in 1905 and Kansas State League in 1906, hosting home games at Sportsman Park in both seasons of minor league play.

History
Vinita, Oklahoma first hosted minor league baseball in 1905. The Vinita Cherokees became members of the Class C level Missouri Valley League. The Cherokees joined the Fort Scott Giants, McAlester Miners/Fort Smith Giants, Muskogee Reds, Parsons Preachers, Pittsburg Miners, Tulsa Oilers and Webb City Gold Bugs as members in the eight–team league.

The Vinita Cherokees began league play on May 14, 1905. The Cherokees finished the 1905 season with a 41–63 record to place seventh in the final standings. The Muskogee Reds folded on August 31, 1905, causing the season schedule to be shortened to September 5. Vinita was managed by Ed Finney as the Cherokees finished 35.5 games behind the first place Pittsburgh Miners in the final standings. The Missouri Valley League permanently folded following the 1905 season.

Vinita gained a team during the 1906 season, their final season of minor league play. On June 6, 1906, the Pittsburg Champs of the Class D level Kansas State League moved from Pittsburg, Kansas to Vinita. Pittsburg had a 16–15 record at the time of the move. After resuming play in Vinita, the Pittsburg/Vinita team ended the 1906 season with a 30–25 overall record, playing under managers Henry Bartley and William Burns. The team folded on July 5, 1906.

Vinita, Oklahoma has not hosted another minor league team.

The ballpark
The Vinita teams hosted home minor league games at Sportsman Park. Henry E. Ridenhour was referenced as the "proprietor" of the ballpark.

Timeline

Year–by–year records

Notable alumni

Raleigh Aitchison (1905)
Chick Brandom (1906)
Harley Young (1906)

See also
Vinita Cherokees players

References

External links
Vinita - Baseball Reference

Baseball teams established in 1905
Defunct minor league baseball teams
Professional baseball teams in Oklahoma
Baseball teams disestablished in 1905
Defunct baseball teams in Oklahoma
Defunct Missouri Valley League teams
Craig County, Oklahoma